WZVL is a country music radio station licensed to Philo, Ohio, broadcasting on 103.7 FM.  WZVL serves the Zanesville area and is owned by Marquee Broadcasting.

Originally owned by Southeastern Ohio Broadcasting System, which often does business as the WHIZ Media Group, the station went on the air in August 2011; following a week of half-power operation, it formally launched on August 29. WZVL was included in Marquee Broadcasting's 2022 purchase of the WHIZ Media Group stations from the Littick family; the deal was completed on July 14, 2022.

References

External links 

Country radio stations in the United States
ZVL
Radio stations established in 2011
2011 establishments in Ohio
Marquee Broadcasting